Nintendo Network Service Database (NSD), formerly known as Wii no Ma, was a Japanese company. Originally created by Nintendo to provide digital entertainment as a service for Wii owners, the company has since been renamed.

Until its liquidation, Nintendo Network Services handled all Nintendo Network operations, including programming and server maintenance inside Nintendo's in-house projects through its Nintendo Network Business & Development division and throughout various other external online software infrastructures. Lastly, the company also cooperated in developing third party online infrastructures compatible with Nintendo consoles and the Nintendo Network.

History

Wii no Ma

 was a video-on-demand service channel run by Nintendo in co-operation with Dentsu to produce the programs and advertisements. Wii no Ma was viewable by those with a Wii and an Internet connection and it featured family-oriented content, such as cartoons, brain-training quizzes, cookery, educational shows, and other programs produced exclusively for Nintendo. Broadcast began in Japan on May 1, 2009. In 2010, several trademarks were filed for the name.

The channel's interface was built around a virtual living room, where up to eight Miis could be registered and interact with each other. The virtual living room contained a TV which took the viewer to the video list. Celebrity "concierge" Mii's occasionally introduced special programming.

The senior executive at Fuji Television stated that if plans to make the Wii the centerpiece of the living room took off in a meaningful way, it would be the stuff of television producers' nightmares.

A DSiWare application called Dokodemo Wii no Ma could be downloaded free for Japanese users of the Nintendo DSi, and allowed them to download programs from Wii no Ma on the Wii onto the DSi, and then play them back. It also allowed users to download coupons onto the DSi, which can be scanned off the screen at a store.

2012 renaming
Nintendo ceased operation of the Wii no Ma Channel on April 30, 2012, renaming the company Nintendo Network  Service Database.

In 2018, Nintendo Network Services was liquidated.

Other
Netflix Video on demand

See also
Nintendo Video
St.GIGA's Satellaview

References

Nintendo services
Service Database